Henry Blake Hays (1829–1881) was a leader of the coal industry in Allegheny County, Pennsylvania.

Early life
He was born August 12, 1829, in Allegheny County, Pennsylvania, the son of James H. Hays and Mary Cready.

Military career
He served as a captain in the 6th U.S. Cavalry during the Civil War from 1861 to his resignation in 1864.

Industrial career
As the son of James H. Hays, he helped run the family coal mines.  He operated the H.B. Hays and Brothers Coal Railroad, a narrow gauge coal railroad with branches that ran along Becks Run and Streets Run.  He was a director of the Pittsburgh, Virginia and Charleston Railway.

He married Mary Howard in Pittsburgh on November 17, 1869, and they had two children.

He died at his home in Allegheny County on August 10, 1881.

References

American businesspeople in the coal industry
1829 births
1881 deaths
Mining in Pennsylvania
People from Allegheny County, Pennsylvania
19th-century American businesspeople